Dirang is one of the 60 assembly constituencies of  Arunachal Pradesh a north east state of India. It is part of Arunachal East Lok Sabha constituency.

Members of the Legislative Assembly 
 1990: Lobsang Tsering, Independent
 1995: Tsering Gyurme, Indian National Congress
 1999: Tsering Gyurme, Indian National Congress
 2004: Tsering Gyurme, Indian National Congress
 2009: Phurpa Tsering, People's Party of Arunachal
 2014: Phurpa Tsering, People's Party of Arunachal

Election results

2019

See also

 Dirang
 Tawang district
 List of constituencies of Arunachal Pradesh Legislative Assembly

References

Assembly constituencies of Arunachal Pradesh
West Kameng district